The Cessna 210 Centurion is a six-seat, high-performance, retractable-gear, single-engined, high-wing general-aviation light aircraft. First flown in January 1957, it was produced by Cessna until 1986.

Development

It was essentially a Cessna 182B to which was added a retractable landing gear, swept tail, and a new wing.

In 1961, the fuselage and wing were completely redesigned: the fuselage was made wider and deeper, and a third side window was added. To compensate for the reduced aileron span, the aileron profile was changed and its chord enlarged.

The 1964 model 210D introduced a  engine and two small child seats, set into the cavity that contained the mainwheels aft of the passengers.

In 1967, the model 210G introduced a cantilever wing replacing the strut-braced wing. Its planform changed to a constant taper from root chord to tip chord.

In 1970, the 210K became the first full six-seat model. This was achieved by replacing the flat leaf springs used for the retractable main landing gear struts (undercarriage) with tapered tubular steel struts of greater length. This allowed the tires to be nested farther to the rear of the fuselage, making room for the full-sized rear seats. The Centurion II was an option introduced in 1970 with improved avionics, and was available in both normally aspirated and turbocharged versions (Turbo Centurion II)

In 1979, the 210N model eliminated the folding doors, which previously covered the two retracted main wheels. The tubular spring struts retract into shallow channels along the bottom of the fuselage and the wheels fit snugly in closed depressions on the underside of the fuselage. Some models featured deicing boots as an option.

Design

The aircraft was offered in a normally aspirated version, the model 210, as well as the turbocharged T210 and the pressurized P210 versions.

Operational history 
On 21 May 2012, the airworthiness authority responsible for the design, the US Federal Aviation Administration, issued an Emergency Airworthiness Directive requiring 3,665 of the cantilever-wing Cessna 210s to be inspected for cracks in the spar cap, wing spar, and wing. Aircraft with more than 10,000 hours of airframe time were grounded immediately pending a visual inspection.

On 26 May 2019, a Cessna Model T210M airplane suffered an in-flight separation of the right wing. Preliminary investigations found cracking of the wing-spar carry-through where fatigue began from a small corrosion pit on the lower surface of the carry-through. Textron published a mandatory service letter (SEL-57-06) on June 24, 2019, to provide instructions for a detailed visual inspection of the wing carry-through spar. Since it shared a common carry-through design, the Cessna 177 Cardinal also received a similar mandatory service letter (SELF-57-07) and an airworthiness concern from the FAA. The FAA issued an Airworthiness Directive on 21 February 2020 mandating eddy current inspections of the carry-through spar lower cap, corrective action if necessary, application of a protective coating and corrosion inhibiting compound, and reporting the inspection results to the FAA.

Modifications

A wide range of modifications are available for the Cessna 210, including:
Aeronautical Engineers Australia has developed a life extension package for 210s suffering from wing-spar carry-through beam corrosion.
Crownair Aviation developed a Centurion Edition T210, which is a remanufactured aircraft introduced in November 2008 that features a glass cockpit and new engine along with other minor refinements.
Griggs Aircraft Refinishing offers a Rolls-Royce Model 250 turboprop conversion of the T210 and P210N known as the "Silver Eagle". This conversion was previously offered by O&N Aircraft
Vitatoe Aviation offers the TN550 conversion which uses a Continental IO-550P engine with an IO-520 turbocharger with dual intercoolers and a larger alternator.

Variants

The Cessna 210 was manufactured in 26 model variants: C210, C210A-D, the Centurion C210E-H&J, Turbo Centurion T210F-H&J, the Centurion II C210K-N&R, the Turbo Centurion II T210K-N&R and the P210N&R.  The 210N, T210N (turbocharged), and P210N (pressurized) versions were produced in the greatest quantity.  The rarest and most expensive models were the T210R and P210R, which were produced only in small quantities in 1985-86.  Several modifications and optional fittings are also available, including different engine installations, wingtip tanks, speed brakes, short-take-off-and-landing kits, and gear door modifications.

The early strut-winged Cessna 210B was developed into a fixed-gear aircraft known as the Cessna 205.  This spawned an entirely new family of Cessna aircraft, including the 206 and the eight-seat 207.

210
Four-seat production variant with a Continental IO-470-E engine, 40 degree hydraulic flaps, gear doors, introduced in 1960., first flown in 1957, 575 built.
210A
A 210 with a third cabin window on each side, introduced in 1961, 265 built.
210B
A 210A with a cut-down rear fuselage, a rear-vision window and a Continental IO-470-S engine, introduced in 1962, 245 built.
210C
A 210B with some minor changes, introduced in 1963, 135 built.
210D Centurion
210E Centurion
A 210D with some minor changes, introduced in 1965, 205 built.
210F Centurion / Turbo Centurion
A 210E with some minor changes and optional  turbocharged Continental TSIO-520-C engine, introduced in 1966, 300 built.
210G Centurion / Turbo Centurion
210H Centurion / Turbo Centurion
A 210G with a new flap system and instrument panel, 210 built. Introduced in 1968.
210J Centurion / Turbo Centurion
A 210H with reduced wing dihederal, different nose profile and a Continental IO-520-J (or TSIO-520H) engine, introduced in 1969, 200 built.
210K Centurion / Turbo Centurion

A 210K with nose-mounted landing lights, the electrical system changed to 24 volt, the engine-driven hydraulic pump replaced with an electrical pump and a three-bladed prop fitted. Produced 1972-76, 2070 built.
210M Centurion / Turbo Centurion
A 210L with an optional  TSIO-520-R engine and minor changes, produced 1977-80, 1381 built.
210N Centurion / Turbo Centurion
A 210M with open wheel wells for main landing gear and minor changes. Although this change appeared only on the C210N, most early models have had gear doors removed due to extensive maintenance and handling problems, leaving them similar to the "N". Produced  1981-84, 1943 built.

A 210N with longer-span stabilizers and minor changes, produced 1985-86, 112 built.

A Turbo 210N with pressurized cabin, four windows each side, with a  Continental TSIO-520-AF engine, produced 1978-83, 834 built.
P210R Pressurized Centurion
A P210N with longer-span stabilizers, increased takeoff weight and a  Continental TSIO-520-CE engine, produced 1985-86, 40 built.
Riley Turbine P-210

Operators

Civil
The Cessna 210 is widely used by flight training schools, private operators, air-taxi and commercial charter, and private companies.

Military

Accidents and incidents
12 August 1964, Charles Clifford Ogle took off in a Cessna 210A N9492X, flying from Oakland, California, to Las Vegas, Nevada. He disappeared and his airplane may have crashed in the Sierra Nevada, California.
On 12 July 1968, Leonard Bendicks hijacked a Cessna 210 from Key West, Florida, to Cuba. He was deported to the US in September 1968. On 4 March 1971, he was sentenced to 10 years for kidnapping.
On 9 August 1981, a Cessna 210M, VH-MDX crashed around the Barrington Tops National Park in New South Wales, killing all five on board.  The Australian Transport Safety Bureau reports mentions icing, violent weather, and instrument failure.
While flying N6579X, an early-model 210A, famed test pilot Scott Crossfield crashed and died in the woods of Ludville, Georgia, on April 19, 2006. The National Transportation Safety Board established the probable cause as "[t]he pilot's failure to obtain updated en route weather information, which resulted in his continued instrument flight into a widespread area of severe convective activity, and the air traffic controller's failure to provide adverse weather avoidance assistance, as required by Federal Aviation Administration directives, both of which led to the airplane's encounter with a severe thunderstorm and subsequent loss of control."
On 26 May 2019, about 25 km north‑east of Mount Isa Airport in Australia, the right wing separated from a Cessna T210M. The structural failure led to a rapid loss of control and a collision with terrain. Both crew members were killed, and the aircraft was destroyed. The Australian Transport Safety Bureau (ATSB) found that a pre-existing fatigue crack in the aircraft's wing spar carry-through structure propagated to a critical size resulting in an overstress fracture of the structure and separation of the right wing. The accident resulted in the issue of an airworthiness directive mandating visual and eddy current inspections of the carry-through spar lower cap and the application of a protective coating, plus a corrosion inhibiting compound. The ATSB stated that this accident would not have occurred if previously mandated inspections, due to past wing failures, had not been extended to be required only every three years. Following this crash a new service bulletin was issued and an FAA Airworthiness Directive, but inspections remained as every three years. The ATSB recommended more action to prevent future wing failures.

Specifications (T210N Turbo Centurion II)

See also

References

Notes

Bibliography

External links

 FAA Type Certificate Data Sheet 3A21 Type Certificate Data Sheet for Cessna 210 models.

210
High-wing aircraft
Single-engined tractor aircraft
1950s United States civil utility aircraft
Aircraft first flown in 1957